The Tennessee Department of Revenue (TDOR) is an agency within the Tennessee state government that is responsible for administering the state’s tax laws and motor vehicle title and registration laws. More than 800 people work for the Department of Revenue.

The Department collects about 87 percent of total state revenue. During the 2018 fiscal year, it collected $14.5 billion in state taxes and fees and more than $2.8 billion in taxes and fees for local governments.

The Department is led by Commissioner David Gerregano.

See also
Tennessee Department of Financial Institutions
Tennessee General Assembly

References

External links
Department of Revenue website
Tennessee Taxpayer Access Point (TNTAP) Tax Filing Website
Tennessee Blue Book Executive Branch Agencies
State of Tennessee website

State agencies of Tennessee
Taxation in Tennessee
US state tax agencies